Stuart Millheiser was born in Brooklyn, New York. After graduating from Cornell University with a BS, he came to California in 1980. He founded Pecos Pharmaceuticals in the early 1990s and sold it at age 51.

In 2007 he started the ALS Guardian Angels, A 501(c)(3) charity for the purpose of helping ALS (Amyotrophic lateral sclerosis) victims live with the disease and maintain the highest quality of life possible. He funds most of the charity’s work from his own savings and receives outside donations through fundraisers and private donations. Stuart helps people from all over the world who have Amyotrophic lateral sclerosis.

References

External links
 ALS Guardian Angels

Living people
People from Brooklyn
Samuel Curtis Johnson Graduate School of Management alumni
Year of birth missing (living people)
American company founders